Bodhananda (1883–1928) was an Indian Hindu philosopher. He was the disciple and the nominated successor of his guru, called Narayana Guru, though both died only days apart.

References

External links
Narayanagurukulam

1883 births
1928 deaths
20th-century Indian philosophers
20th-century Hindu philosophers and theologians
Narayana Guru